Tamachan Momkoonthod (born 14 April 1997) is a Thai tennis player.

Momkoonthod has a career-high singles ranking by the  Women's Tennis Association (WTA) of 705, achieved on 16 May 2016. She also has a career-high WTA doubles ranking of 682, reached on 23 July 2018. Momkoonthod has won four doubles titles at tournaments of the ITF Women's Circuit.

Momkoonthod also represented Thailand in Fed Cup competition.

ITF Circuit finals

Doubles: 9 (4 titles, 5 runner–ups)

References

External links
 
 
 

1995 births
Living people
Tamachan Momkoonthod
Tamachan Momkoonthod
Tamachan Momkoonthod